Chai Hon Yam (10 July 1927 – 7 December 2017) was a Singaporean field hockey player. He competed in the men's tournament at the 1956 Summer Olympics.

References

External links
 
 

1927 births
2017 deaths
Singaporean male field hockey players
Olympic field hockey players of Singapore
Field hockey players at the 1956 Summer Olympics
People from Perak
Malaysian sportspeople of Chinese descent
Malaysian emigrants to Singapore
Singaporean sportspeople of Chinese descent